This article summarizes the outcomes of all official matches played by the Mexico national football team by opponent and by year.

Note: Mexico's goals are placed first.

All Time Results

The following table shows Mexico's all-time international record, correct as of 17 Nov 2020.

Results 1923-2023

Results 2000–2022

Unofficial matches

See also
Mexico at the CONCACAF Gold Cup
Mexico at the CONCACAF Nations League
Mexico at the Copa América
Mexico at the FIFA World Cup

Notes

References

 

Mexico national football team matches